Nidhi Shah is an Indian television actress best known for her portrayal of Poorva Sharma Shetty in Tu Aashiqui and Kinjal Dave Shah in Anupamaa.

Career
Shah made her acting debut as a child artist in the 2011 web series That's So Awesome. She then played small cameos in the 2013 Hindi films Mere Dad Ki Maruti and Phata Poster Nikhla Hero respectively.

She made her television debut in 2016 with Jaana Na Dil Se Door portraying Shweta Kashyap.

From 2017 to 2018, she portrayed Poorva Sharma Shetty opposite Kiran Raj in Tu Aashiqui. In 2019, she portrayed Suman Patwardhan in Kavach ... Mahashivrati. 

She portrayed Shanaya Arora in Kartik Purnima opposite Chirag Mahbubani in 2020. She also portrayed Vidhi in the web series Dating Siyapaa the same year.

Since July 2020, Shah is seen portraying Kinjal Dave Shah opposite Ashish Mehrotra in Anupamaa, it proved as a major turning point in her career.

Filmography

Films

Television

Web series

Music videos

Awards and nominations

See also
 List of Hindi television actresses

References

External links

Indian television actresses
Year of birth missing (living people)
Living people
21st-century Indian actresses